Elizabeth Anne Blandthorn (born 1 August 1977) is an Australian politician. She is a member of the Victorian Legislative Council representing the Western Metropolitan Region since November 2022, and previously served as the member for the Electoral district of Pascoe Vale in the Victorian Legislative Assembly between November 2014 and November 2022. She is a member of the Labor Party.

Between June and December 2022, Blandthorn has served as the Minister for Planning in the Second Andrews ministry, as well as the Leader of the House in the Legislative Assembly. After her shift to the upper house at the 2022 state election, in December 2022, she was appointed the Minister for Child Protection and Family Services and Minister for Disability, Ageing and Carers in the Third Andrews ministry, as well as the Deputy Leader of the Government in the Legislative Council.

Early career 
She held the position of General Secretary in the National Union of Students in 2001.  She was both a god-daughter and former political staffer to Christine Campbell, the previous member for Pascoe Vale.

References

External links
 Parliamentary voting record of Lizzie Blandthorn at Victorian Parliament Tracker

1977 births
Living people
Australian Labor Party members of the Parliament of Victoria
Members of the Victorian Legislative Assembly
21st-century Australian politicians
Women members of the Victorian Legislative Assembly
Labor Right politicians
21st-century Australian women politicians